Oliver McMullan (born 22 March 1952) is an Irish Sinn Féin politician, who was a Member of the Legislative Assembly (MLA) for East Antrim  from  2011 to 2017. He was also elected to Larne Borough Council in the 2011 local elections.

McMullan was active in business life in his native Cushendall, where he owned a local pub. He entered politics in 1993 when he was elected as an Independent to Moyle District Council, topping the poll. He also topped the poll in the same elections in 1997 and 2001, standing as either an Independent or Independent Nationalist.

McMullan headed the Independent McMullan list in the 1996 elections to the Northern Ireland Forum. He received 670 votes (2%) in North Antrim, with the list receiving 927 votes (0.12%) across Northern Ireland, meaning that no candidates were elected. McMullan failed to be elected in the same constituency in the 1998 elections, where he polled 1.0%.

He joined Sinn Féin before the 2003 Assembly elections and stood unsuccessfully for the party in East Antrim in those elections and the 2007 Assembly elections. He was re-elected to Moyle District Council in 2005, serving as the first Sinn Féin chairman of the council and a board member on the North Eastern Education and Library Board. He was also a member of Sinn Féin's All Ireland Advisory Committees for Agriculture, Tourism and Rural Development.

After 18 years as a member of Moyle Council, McMullan contested and won a seat on Larne Borough Council in May 2011, standing in and topping the poll in the Coast Road electoral area. In doing so he became the first Sinn Féin councilor on the predominantly unionist council. In November 2011 he resigned from the council, enabling fellow Sinn Féin member James McKeown to take his place.

Just over a week after gaining election he received a death threat from a group claiming to be called the 'Loyalist Action Force'.

McMullan spoke about a family that had been the target of several racist attacks in Glenarm, saying, "There has been a petrol bomb thrown at the house and there has been another occasion when acid was poured over their vehicle."

In 2013, he revealed he was suffering from prostate cancer.

Standing for re-election in the 2016 Assembly election, he retained his seat with 2,633 votes. He lost his seat at the 2017 Assembly election.

References

External links
NIA profile

1952 births
Living people
Northern Ireland MLAs 2011–2016
Members of Larne Borough Council
People from County Antrim
Sinn Féin MLAs
Northern Ireland MLAs 2016–2017
Sinn Féin councillors in Northern Ireland
Sinn Féin parliamentary candidates